Joshua Aaron Charles (born September 15, 1971) is an American film, television, and theater actor. He is best known for the roles of Dan Rydell on Sports Night;  Will Gardner on The Good Wife, which earned him two Primetime Emmy Award nominations; and his early work as Knox Overstreet in Dead Poets Society.

Early life
Charles is the son of Allan Charles, an advertising executive. He is Jewish on his father's side and has described himself as Jewish. He began his career performing comedy at the age of nine. As a teenager, he spent several summers at Stagedoor Manor Performing Arts Center in New York, and attended the Baltimore School for the Arts.

Career
Charles' film debut was in fellow Baltimore native John Waters' Hairspray in 1988. The following year, he starred alongside Robin Williams and Ethan Hawke in the Oscar-winning Dead Poets Society. Subsequent film roles have included Don't Tell Mom the Babysitter's Dead, Threesome, Pie in the Sky, Muppets from Space, S.W.A.T, Four Brothers, After.Life, Crossing the Bridge and Brief Interviews with Hideous Men.

On television, Charles played sports anchor Dan Rydell in Aaron Sorkin's Emmy Award-winning Sports Night, which ran for two years (1998–2000) on ABC and earned Charles a Screen Actors Guild nomination. In 2008, Charles played the role of Jake in season one of HBO's In Treatment. In 2009, he returned to network television in the CBS drama The Good Wife. For his work on the series, he was nominated for a Primetime Emmy Award for Outstanding Supporting Actor in a Drama Series in 2011 and 2014. 

Also in 2011, Charles narrated the debut episode for NFL Network's A Football Life on New England Patriots head coach Bill Belichick. In 2022, Charles starred in We Own This City, an HBO limited series from David Simon.

In theater, Charles headlined a production of Jonathan Marc Sherman's Confrontationin 1986. In 2004, he appeared on stage in New York in a revival of Neil LaBute's The Distance From Here, which received a Drama Desk Award for Best Ensemble Cast. In January 2006, he appeared in the world premiere of Richard Greenberg's The Well-Appointed Room for the Steppenwolf Theatre Company in Chicago, and followed this with a run at the American Conservatory Theater in San Francisco, portraying the cloned brothers in Caryl Churchill's A Number. In 2007, he appeared in Adam Bock's The Receptionist at the Manhattan Theatre Club.

Personal life
In September 2013, Charles married ballet dancer and author Sophie Flack. On December 9, 2014, Flack gave birth to the couple's first child, a son named Rocco. On August 23, 2018, Charles revealed on his Instagram that Flack gave birth to their second child, a daughter named Eleonor.

He is a fan of the Baltimore Ravens and Baltimore Orioles. In a few films, he donned an Oriole baseball cap.

Filmography

Film

Television

Awards and nominations

References

External links
 
 
 
 People Weekly 1989 interview
 Josh Charles on The Daily Show, April 13, 1999
 Rob Neyer interview 2003

1971 births
20th-century American male actors
21st-century American male actors
American male film actors
American male stage actors
American male television actors
Jewish American male actors
Living people
Male actors from Baltimore
21st-century American Jews